Ideal Girl's College, Imphal, established in 1970, is a women's degree college in Imphal, Manipur. It offers undergraduate courses in arts and sciences. It is affiliated to  Manipur University.

Accreditation
The college is recognized by the University Grants Commission (UGC).

See also
List of institutions of higher education in Manipur

References

External links

Colleges affiliated to Manipur University
Educational institutions established in 1970
Universities and colleges in Manipur
1970 establishments in Manipur